Natalia Mărăşescu (née Andrei on 3 October 1952) is a retired Romanian middle distance runner who specialized mainly in the 1500 metres. She competed in this event at the 1976 and 1980 Olympics and placed ninth in 1980.

Biography
Mărăşescu set two world records over the mile; 4:23.8 minutes on 21 May 1977 in Bucharest, and 4:22.09 minutes on 27 January 1979 in Auckland. The record was broken by Mary Slaney won ran in 4:21.68 minutes a year later in the same city. The current record is 4:12.33.  She briefly held the record in the 5000 metres, with 15:41.4 minutes. This record lasted less than four months before being broken by Jan Merrill.

Doping ban
Mărăşescu was banned 18 months for taking anabolic steroids in 1979. After 8 months Mărăşescu was reinstated after IAAF President Adriaan Paulen of the Netherlands said that an 18-month suspension in the steroid case would have kept the women out of the Moscow Olympics, which would have constituted "an extra penalty." He said that the IAAF Council had therefore reinstated them for "humane reasons."

References 

1952 births
Doping cases in athletics
Romanian sportspeople in doping cases
Living people
Romanian female middle-distance runners
Athletes (track and field) at the 1976 Summer Olympics
Athletes (track and field) at the 1980 Summer Olympics
Olympic athletes of Romania
European Athletics Championships medalists
Universiade medalists in athletics (track and field)
Universiade gold medalists for Romania
Universiade silver medalists for Romania